Quesnelia edmundoi is a species of flowering plant in the family Bromeliaceae, endemic to Brazil. It was first described by Lyman Bradford Smith in 1851. It is found in the Atlantic Forest ecoregion only within Rio de Janeiro state, in southeastern Brazil.

See also

References 

edmundoi
Endemic flora of Brazil
Flora of the Atlantic Forest
Flora of Rio de Janeiro (state)
Plants described in 1851